Budapest Gypsy Symphony Orchestra is a Hungarian symphony orchestra of Romani (Gypsy) musicians. It emphasizes works by composers inspired by Hungarian folk and urban music including Franz Liszt, Johannes Brahms, Vittorio Monti, Piotr Tchaïkovski, Johann Strauss and Johann Strauss II. The orchestra has been performing for 
30 years as a classical symphony orchestra.

Recognition 

The Orchestra was awarded the Hungarian Heritage Prize and it was entered in the Golden Book and the Invisible Museum of the Hungarian Spirit. In 2000 the Orchestra entered the Guinness Book of Records. In 2014 the Orchestra, both commonly referred to as Budapest Gypsy Symphony Orchestra and One Hundred Gypsy Musicians (100 Tagú Cigányzenekar) was designated a "hungaricum", a national treasure recognized by the Hungarian Parliament.

History
In 1984, soloist and Hungarian Romani conductor, the Primas (first violin and leader) Sándor Járóka ('The Primas of kings and the king of Primases') died.

At his funeral, the Roma community gathered. Musicians gathered and from a gloomy serenade over a grave, the group was born.

The orchestra became world-famous. Budapest rehearsals were repeatedly visited by György Cziffra, the Hungarian gypsy pianist who later became the Association's honorary president.

László Berki, the conductor of the National Hungarian State Ensemble, led the orchestra until his death in October 1997. It is his doing that Hungary's best musicians are members. Members have family names such as Lakatos, Lendvai Csócsi, Boross, Berki, all Hungarian Romani musician dynasties.

In 1997, Sándor Rigó Buffó became the conductor and artistic director. He rose to president since December 2005.  He died on 27 April 2014. Nándor Beke Farkas was the President and the leader of the orchestra from May 2014 and the new artistic director with József Lendvai Csócsi as violin master.

Formation
 60 Violins
 09 Violas
 06 Cellos
 10 Double basses
 09 Clarinets
 06 Cimbaloms

Members

Directors
 President: Nándor Beke Farkas
 Leader and artistic director: József Lendvai Csócsi

Leading soloists
 First violins:
László Berki Jr
András Suki
Ferenc Lendvai Jr
Gyula Mici Farkas
Tibor Lukács
Lőrinc Danyi
Norbert Salasovics
Jenő Lendvai
József Sárközi
János Johan
 Cimbalom: Oszkár Ökrős
 Alto violins: László Tabányi, Lajos Bóni
 Second violins: Jenő Horhát, József Toldi
 Clarinet: András Puporka, Dezső Oláh
 Double Bass: Károly Horváth, Tamás Radics
 Cello: Károly Szegfű, Barnabás Vajda

References

External links
 

Hungarian orchestras
Hungarian Romani musical groups
Musical groups established in 1985
1985 establishments in Hungary